Ādurbād-ī Mahraspand ("Ādurbād, son of Mahraspand") was an influential Zoroastrian high priest (mowbedan mowbed) during the reign of the Sasanian king (shah) Shapur II.

Biography

In the Middle Persian Bundahishn, Adurbad's lineage is traced back to the legendary Dursarw, a son of the Pishdadian king Manuchehr. In al-Biruni's The Remaining Signs of Past Centuries, he is also mentioned as the descendant of Dursarw. According to the Denkard, Adurbad was from the "village Kuran", which may be a corruption of "a village of Makran", a province in southeastern Iran. The place may also refer to a place in Pars.

According to Zoroastrian traditions, a proof of the validity of his line of religious traditions was that he underwent the ordeal of molten bronze. That is metal was poured on his chest and he emerged as unscathed. According to Iranica, "In keeping with his religious zeal, Ādurbād was a force in the enactment and implementing of decrees against non-Zoroastrians; the established church is described as having then fallen on evil days, plagued by doubt and infidelity.".

Various standard texts (collection of wise counsels) are attributed to him. The Denkard ascribes admonitions to Adurbad; and an Arabic version of these admonitions occur in the work of Miskawayh's . Two groups of his counsels occur in extant Middle Persian text. The first group of counsels contain his addresses to his and is in part translated by Miskawayh in Arabic. The second group comprises his supposed deathbed utterances. A collection of questions is addressed to him by a disciple and his responses are found in the Pahlavi Rivayat. A translation of some of the Middle Persian counsels exist in the book: R. C. Zaehner, The Teachings of the Magi, London, 1956.

Some Counsels

Do not tell a lie to anyone.
Do not take an oath on either what is true or what is false.
Do not consciously wager on anything at all.
Do not seduce other men's wives, for that is a grievous sin for thy soul.
My son, think upon virtue and do not turn your thoughts to sin, for man does not live eternally and the things of the spirit are the more greatly to be desired.
Be single-minded among rulers and friends.
Do not be violent or ill-considered in your speech, for the man who is violent or ill-considered in his speech is like a fire that falls upon a forest and burns up all birds and fish and creeping things.
If you would not be abused by others, do not abuse anyone
Renew your friendship with old friends, for an old friend is like old wine which becomes better and more fit for the consumption of princes the older it is.
Keep your hands from stealing, your feet from treading the path of undutifulness, and your mind from unlawful desires (varan), for whoso practices virtue obtains his reward, and whoso commits sin receives his
Whoso digs a pit for his enemies will fall into it himself.
Do not deliver yourself up as a slave to any man.
Do not mock anyone.
Listen to all that you hear and do not repeat it at random.
Hold a wise man whose position is exalted in high esteem, ask his opinion and listen to it.
Cherish a wise and modest woman and ask her in marriage.
Be of good repute so that you may live at ease.
Do not destroy your own soul for the sake of anger or vengeance
Honour your father and mother, listen to them and obey them, for so long as a man's father and mother live, he is like a lion in the jungle which has no fear of anyone at all; but he who has neither father nor mother is like a widowed woman who is despoiled by men and can do nothing about it and whom all men despise.
Do good and keep your doors open to any who may come from far or near, for he who does not do good and does not keep his doors open, will find the door of Heaven and of Paradise closed.
Do not be unduly glad when good fortune attends you, and do not be unduly downcast when misfortune befalls you.

Notes

References

Sources

External links

The Counsels of Adhurbadh, Son of Mahraspand  (R. C. Zaehner, The Teachings of the Magi, London, 1956.)
Sayings of Adarbad Mahraspandan  (Translation from R. C. Zaehner, The Teachings of the Magi, London, 1956, p. 110 ff.)

4th-century Iranian people
4th-century philosophers
Iranian religious leaders
Iranian philosophers
Ancient Iranian philosophers
Zoroastrian priests
Iranian ethicists
People from the Sasanian Empire
Shapur II